Sarrazin or Sarazin may refer to:

People
 Albertine Sarrazin, French author
 Cyprien Sarrazin, French alpine skier
 Dick Sarrazin, ice hockey player
 Jacques Sarazin or Sarrazin (1588/90–1660), French sculptor
 Jean Sarrazin (1770–1819), French general who abandoned Napoleon in 1810 
 Jean François Sarrazin, French author
 Kim Sarrazin, Canadian softball player
 Manuel Sarrazin (born 1982), German politician
 Michael Sarrazin, Canadian actor
 Michel Sarrazin, Canadian scientist and naturalist
 Stéphane Sarrazin, French racing driver
 Thilo Sarrazin, German politician

Other
 Sarrazin Couture Entertainment, a motion picture and television production company
 Castel-Sarrazin

See also 
 Saracen (disambiguation)
 Sarrasin

French-language surnames
Ethnonymic surnames